The list of modern universities in Europe (1801–1940) contains all universities that were founded in Europe after the French Revolution and before the end of World War II. Universities are regarded as comprising all institutions of higher education recognized as universities by the public or ecclesiastical authorities in charge and authorized to confer academic degrees in more than one faculty. Temporary foundations are also included. Where institutions not meeting the definition of a University are included (e.g. university colleges) these are indicated by footnotes.

At the outset of the 19th century, European universities had been severely affected by the Napoleonic Wars, their number falling in the brief span of time between 1789 and 1815 from 143 to 83. By 1840 their number recovered to 98 universities with approximately 80,000 students and 5,000 professors. Notwithstanding the trend towards specialized institutions of higher learning – in France, for instance, the universities had been suppressed and replaced by Grandes écoles – the size of the student and professor bodies multiplied over the next hundred years, attaining a size of 600,000 and 32,000 members respectively at around two hundred universities. In total, the period saw about 220 universities in existence that are listed below.

List 

The list is sorted by the date of recognition. At places where more than one university was established, the name of the institution is given in brackets.

19th century

20th century

See also 
 List of universities and colleges in Europe
 History of European universities
 List of oldest universities in continuous operation
 List of early modern universities in Europe

Notes

References

Sources 
 Rüegg, Walter: "Themes", in: Rüegg, Walter (ed.): A History of the University in Europe. Vol. III: Universities in the Nineteenth and Early Twentieth Centuries (1800–1945), Cambridge University Press, 2004, pp. 3–31
 Rüegg, Walter: "European Universities and Similar Institutions in Existence between 1812 and the End of 1944: A Chronological List: Universities", in: Rüegg, Walter (ed.): A History of the University in Europe. Vol. III: Universities in the Nineteenth and Early Twentieth Centuries (1800–1945), Cambridge University Press, 2004, pp. 673–691

Further reading 
 Jílek, Jubor (ed.): "Historical Compendium of European Universities/Répertoire Historique des Universités Européennes", Standing Conference of Rectors, Presidents and Vice-Chancellors of the European Universities (CRE), Geneva 1984
 Ridder-Symoens, Hilde de (ed.): A History of the University in Europe. Vol. I: Universities in the Middle Ages, Cambridge University Press, 1992, 
 Ridder-Symoens, Hilde de (ed.): A History of the University in Europe. Vol. II: Universities in Early Modern Europe (1500–1800), Cambridge University Press, 1996, 
 Rüegg, Walter (ed.): A History of the University in Europe. Vol. IV: Universities Since 1945, Cambridge University Press, 2011, 

 Modern Universities In Europe 1801 To 1945